Fundamental Concepts in Programming Languages were an influential set of lecture notes written by Christopher Strachey for the International Summer School in Computer Programming at Copenhagen in August, 1967. It introduced much programming language terminology still in use today, including "R-value" and "L-value", "ad hoc polymorphism", "parametric polymorphism", and "referential transparency".

The lecture notes were reprinted in 2000 in a special issue of Higher-Order and Symbolic Computation in memory of Strachey.

Bibliography

See also 
 CPL (programming language)

References

External links 
 Higher-Order and Symbolic Computation Volume 13, Issue 1/2 (April 2000) Special Issue in memory of Christopher Strachey
 Fundamental Concepts In Programming Languages at the Portland Pattern Repository
 Fundamental Concepts In Programming Languages at the College of Information Sciences and Technology at Pennsylvania State University
 ACM Digital Library
 Great Works in Programming Languages. Collected by Benjamin C. Pierce.

1967 in computing
1967 documents
Computer science literature